Pia Riva (born 4 April 1935) is an Italian skier. She competed in Alpine skiing at the 1960 Winter Olympics and the 1964 Winter Olympics.

References

External links
 

1935 births
Living people
Alpine skiers at the 1960 Winter Olympics
Alpine skiers at the 1964 Winter Olympics
Italian female alpine skiers
Olympic alpine skiers of Italy
Place of birth missing (living people)